Chris Wooten (born August 28, 1968) is an American politician. He is a member of the South Carolina House of Representatives from the 69th District, serving since 2018. He is a member of the Republican party.

Wooten received some notoriety in September 2019 after he was bitten by a snake while outside his house. He recovered and was discharged from the hospital several days after the incident.

References

Living people
1968 births
Republican Party members of the South Carolina House of Representatives
21st-century American politicians